Amir Ali may refer to:
 Amir Ali (lawyer), American civil rights attorney
 Aamir Ali (born 1977), Indian television actor and model
 Syed Amir Ali (1849–1928), Indian lawyer and scholar
 Aamer Ali (born 1978), Pakistani cricketer who has played for Oman 
 Amir Ali (Indian cricketer) (1939–1985), Indian cricketer